Hastings and Manning was an electoral district of the Legislative Assembly in the Australian state of New South Wales from 1880 to 1894. Created to succeed Hastings, it elected two members with voters casting two votes and the two leading candidates being elected. In 1894 it was divided between the single member districts of Hastings and Macleay and Manning.

Members for Hastings and Manning

Election results

References

Former electoral districts of New South Wales
1890 establishments in Australia
1894 disestablishments in Australia
Constituencies established in 1880
Constituencies disestablished in 1894